Storming the Reality Studio: A Casebook of Cyberpunk and Postmodern Science Fiction, edited by Larry McCaffery, was published by Duke University Press in 1992, though most of its contents had been featured in Mississippi Review in 1988.

This collection of fictions by well-known contemporary writers and critical commentary by postmodern theorists addresses issues concerning how cyberpunk functions within postmodern culture.   This casebook became the criterion for promoting the interaction between the genre of science fiction and the literary avant-garde.

In his review of the book in Science Fiction Studies, John Fekete writes, "McCaffery likes to read good books; and his role, as in this text, in introducing interesting and off-beat literary artifacts to readers who might otherwise miss them, is to provide a laudable service with an infectious enthusiasm."

Lance Olsen says in his review: "We're talking Zeitgeist here.  Nothing more, nothing less.  That's what Larry McCaffery's onto in this brilliant new compilation he's edited that you've just got to read.... You can't help getting excited about this collection.  You just can't.  It does nothing less than assemble a 1990s canon of postmodernity."

Fiction Writers Featured in Storming the Reality Studio
Kathy Acker
J. G. Ballard
William S. Burroughs
Pat Cadigan
Samuel R. Delany
Don DeLillo
William Gibson
Harold Jaffe
Richard Kadrey
Marc Laidlaw
Mark Leyner
Joseph McElroy
Misha
Ted Mooney
Thomas Pynchon
Rudy Rucker
Lucius Shepard
Lewis Shiner
John Shirley
Bruce Sterling
William Vollman

Non-Fiction writers featured in Storming the Reality Studio
Jean Baudrillard
Jacques Derrida
Joan Gordon
Veronica Hollinger
Fredric Jameson
Arthur Kroker and David Cook
Timothy Leary
Jean-François Lyotard
Larry McCaffery
Brian McHale
Dave Porush
Bruce Sterling
Darko Suvin
Takayuki Tatsumi

Notes

Science fiction anthologies
Duke University Press books
1992 books
Works originally published in literary magazines
Cyberpunk literature